Mary Woolley Gibbings Cotton, Vicountess Combermere (1799 – 13 August 1889) was an Irish author.  

Mary Woolley Gibbings Cotton, Vicountess Combermere was born in 1799 in Cork, the only daughter of Robert Gibbings, a wealthy Irish physician, and Barbara Woolley.  In 1838, she became the third wife of Stapleton Cotton, 1st Viscount Combermere, 26 years her senior.

She turned to writing late in life, publishing an essay collection in 1863, Our Peculiarities.  Her novel Shattered Idols featured a chemist engaging in poisoning and bigamy.  She also wrote a volume of poetry and edited her late husband's memoirs. 

Mary Woolley Gibbings Cotton, Vicountess Combermere died on 13 August 1889 in Belgrave Square.

Bibliography 

 Our Peculiarities (1863)
 Shattered Idols (1865)
 Memoirs and Correspondence of Field-Marshal Viscount Combermere (1866), editor
 A Friar's Scourge: Nonsense Verses (1876)

References 

Created via preloaddraft
1799 births
1889 deaths
Irish women writers
Writers from Cork (city)